The following is a timeline of the COVID-19 pandemic in Uruguay during 2021.

Timeline

January
1 January 2021: 634 new cases are confirmed. The number of infected people rises to 19,753. The number of infected people rises to 13,990, 74 patients are in ICU and no patient is on intermediate care. 4,640 analyses were made on the day. The deaths of twelve patients were also confirmed, eight from Montevideo, three from Canelones and one from Soriano, raising the total number of deaths to 193.

2 January 2021: 522 new cases are confirmed. The number of infected people rises to 20,275. The number of infected people rises to 14,592, 64 patients are in ICU and no patient is on intermediate care. 3,973 analyses were made on the day. The deaths of eight patients were also confirmed, five from Montevideo, one from Canelones, one from Maldonado and one from Rivera, raising the total number of deaths to 201.

3 January 2021: 559 new cases are confirmed. The number of infected people rises to 20,823. The number of recoveries rises to 15,125, 73 patients are in ICU and no patient is on intermediate care. 5,450 analyses were made on the day. The deaths of three patients were also confirmed, one from Montevideo, one from Canelones and one from San José. raising the total number of deaths to 204.

4 January 2021: 608 new cases are confirmed. The number of infected people rises to 21,426. The number of recoveries rises to 15,539, 72 patients are in ICU and no patient is on intermediate care. 5,038 analyses were made on the day. The deaths of seven patients were also confirmed, four from Montevideo, two from Rivera, and one from Soriano, raising the total number of deaths to 211.

5 January 2021: 683 new cases are confirmed. The number of infected people rises to 22,104. The number of recoveries rises to 15,919, 73 patients are in ICU and no patient is on intermediate care. 7,887 analyses were made on the day. The deaths of six patients from Montevideo were also confirmed, raising the total number of deaths to 217.

6 January 2021: 946 new cases are confirmed. The number of infected people rises to 23,048. The number of recoveries rises to 16,540, 72 patients are in ICU and no patient is on intermediate care. 6,534 analyses were made on the day. The deaths of four patients from Montevideo were also confirmed, raising the total number of deaths to 221.

7 January 2021: 760 new cases are confirmed. The number of infected people rises to 23,807. The number of recoveries rises to 17,098, 79 patients are in ICU and no patient is on intermediate care. 6,031 analyses were made on the day. The deaths of ten patients were also confirmed, nine from Montevideo and one from Canelones, raising the total number of deaths to 231.

8 January 2021: 534 new cases are confirmed. The number of infected people rises to 24,339. The number of recoveries rises to 17,677, 84 patients are in ICU and no patient is on intermediate care. 7,215 analyses were made on the day. The deaths of 9 patients were also confirmed, six from Montevideo, two from Cerro Largo and one from Canelones, raising the total number of deaths to 240.

9 January 2021: 635 new cases are confirmed. The number of infected people rises to 24,974. The number of recoveries rises to 18,372, 89 patients are in ICU and no patient is on intermediate care. 6,336 analyses were made on the day. The deaths of eight patients from Montevideo were also confirmed, raising the total number of deaths to 248.

10 January 2021: 1,215 new cases are confirmed. The number of infected people rises to 26,186. The number of recoveries rises to 19,013, 97 patients are in ICU and no patient is on intermediate care. 8,502 analyses were made on the day. The deaths of eight patients were also confirmed, 7 from Montevideo and one from Canelones, raising the total number of deaths to 256.

11 January 2021: 719 new cases are confirmed. The number of infected people rises to 26,901. The number of recoveries rises to 19,555, 98 patients are in ICU and no patient is on intermediate care. 4,933 analyses were made on the day. The deaths of six patients were also confirmed, four from Montevideo, one from Cerro Largo and one from Rivera, raising the total number of deaths to 262.

12 January 2021: 947 new cases are confirmed. The number of infected people rises to 27,846. The number of recoveries rises to 20,099, 103 patients are in ICU and no patient is on intermediate care. 7.826 analyses were made on the day. The deaths of seven patients were also confirmed, six from Montevideo, and one from Canelones, raising the total number of deaths to 269.

13 January 2021: 630 new cases are confirmed. The number of infected people rises to 28,475. The number of recoveries rises to 20.733, 108 patients are in ICU and no patient is on intermediate care. 7,385 analyses were made on the day. The death of six patients were also confirmed, five from Montevideo and one from San José, raising the total number of deaths to 275.

14 January 2021: 1,078 new cases are confirmed. The number of infected people rises to 29,989. The number of recoveries rises to 21, 685, 113 patients are in ICU and no patient is on intermediate care. 7.640 analyses were made on the day. The deaths of five patients were also confirmed, four from Montevideo and one from Lavalleja, raising the total number of deaths to 280.

15 January 2021: 957 new cases are confirmed. The number of infected people rises to 30,946. The number of recoveries rises to 22.423, 116 patients are in ICU and no patient is on intermediate care. 8.792 analyses were made on the day. The deaths of eleven patients were also confirmed, seven from Montevideo, one from Soriano, one from Tacuarembó, one from Paysandú and one from Canelones, raising the total number of deaths to 291.

16 January 2021: 723 new cases are confirmed. The number of infected people rises to 31,669. The number of recoveries rises to 23,136, 115 patients are in ICU and no patient is on intermediate care. 8,527 analyses were made on the day. The deaths of seven patients were also confirmed, three from Montevideo, one from San José, one from Canelones, one from Maldonado, and one from Artigas, raising the total number of deaths to 298.

17 January 2021: 710 new cases are confirmed. The number of infected people rises to 32,378. The number of recoveries rises to 23,910, 114 patients are in ICU and no patient is on intermediate care. 6,247 analyses were made on the day. The deaths of thirteen patients were also confirmed, eight from Montevideo, three from Canelones and one form Soriano, raising the total number of deaths to 311.

18 January 2021: 494 new cases are confirmed. The number of infected people rises to 32,863. The number of recoveries rises to 24,618, 113 patients are in ICU and no patient is on intermediate care. 4,470 analyses were made on the day. The deaths of eight patients were also confirmed, four from Montevideo, one from Rivera, one from Soriano, one from Cerro Largo, and one from Artigas, raising the total number of deaths to 319.

19 January 2021: 590 new cases are confirmed. The number of infected people rises to 33,446. The number of recoveries rises to 25,410, 104 patients are in ICU and no patient is on intermediate care. 6,396 analyses were made on the day. The deaths of eleven patients were also confirmed, nine from Montevideo, one from Maldonado and one from Cerro Largo, raising the total number of deaths to 330.

20 January 2021: 857 new cases are confirmed. The number of infected people rises to 34,294. The number of recoveries rises to 26.118, 106 patients are in ICU and no patient is on intermediate care. 7,847 analyses were made on the day. The deaths of six patients were also confirmed, two from Montevideo, one from Artigas, one from Tacuarembó, one from San José and one from Durazno, raising the total number of deaths to 336.

21 January 2021: 709 new cases are confirmed. The number of deaths rises to 34,992, which is eleven fewer than the previous cumulative number due to eleven infected people having tested positive in Uruguay and later left the national territory. The number of recoveries rises to 26,927, 98 patients are in ICU and no patient is on intermediate care. 7,330 analyses were made on the day. The deaths of eleven patients were confirmed, nine from Montevideo and two from Canelones, raising the total number of deaths to 347.

22 January 2021: 718 new cases are confirmed. The number of deaths rises to 36,170, which is eight fewer than the previous cumulative number due to eight infected people having tested positive in Uruguay and later left the national territory. The number of recoveries rises to 27,715, 94 patients are in ICU and no patient is on intermediate care. 9,533 analyses were made on the day. The deaths of seventeen patients were confirmed, eleven from Montevideo, two from Cerro Largo, one from Salto, one from Soriano, one from Artigas, and one from Maldonado, raising the total number of deaths to 364.

23 January 2021: 801 new cases are confirmed. The number of infected people rises to 36,967, which is four fewer than the previous cumulative number due to four infected people having tested positive in Uruguay and later left the national territory. The number of recoveries rises to 28,547, 96 patients are in ICU and no patient is on intermediate care. 6,512 analyses were made on the day. The deaths of three patients were also confirmed, two from Montevideo and one from Salto, raising the total number of deaths to 367.

24 January 2021: 670 new cases are confirmed. The number of infected people rises to 37,633, which is four fewer than the previous cumulative number due to four infected people having tested positive in Uruguay and later left the national territory. The number of recoveries rises to 29,270, 99 patients are in ICU and no patient is on intermediate care. 6,512 analyses were made on the day. The deaths of nine patients were also confirmed, seven from Montevideo, one from Durazno and one from Rocha, raising the total number of deaths to 376.

25 January 2021: 412 new cases are confirmed. The number of infected people rises to 38,041, which is four fewer than the previous cumulative number due to four infected people having tested positive in Uruguay and later left the national territory. The number of recoveries rises to 30,143, 99 patients are in ICU and no patient is on intermediate care. 4,467 analyses were made on the day. The deaths of fourteen patients were also confirmed, nine from Montevideo, one from Tacuarembó, one from Paysandú, one from Canelones, one from Rivera and one from Durazno, raising the total number of deaths to 390.

26 January 2021: 644 new cases are confirmed. The number of infected people rises to 38,680, which is five fewer than the previous cumulative number due to five infected people having tested positive in Uruguay and later left the national territory. The number of recoveries rises to 30,861, 92 patients are in ICU and no patient is on intermediate care. 7,308 analyses were made on the day. The deaths of eleven patients were also confirmed, four from Montevideo, two from Canelones, one from Durazno, one from Rivera, one from Treinta y Tres, one from Florida and one from San José, raising the total number of deaths to 401.

27 January 2021: 652 new cases are confirmed. The number of infected people rises to 39,328, which is four fewer than the previous cumulative number due to four infected people having tested positive in Uruguay and later left the national territory. The number of recoveries rises to 31,598, 89 patients are in ICU and no patient is on intermediate care. 7,628 analyses were made on the day. The deaths of six patients were also confirmed, three from Montevideo, one from Soriano, one from Treinta y Tres and one from Canelones, raising the total number of deaths to 407.

28 January 2021: 562 new cases are confirmed. The number of infected people rises to 39,887, which is three fewer than the previous cumulative number due to three infected people having tested positive in Uruguay and later left the national territory. The number of recoveries rises to 32,306, 90 patients are in ICU and no patient is on intermediate care. 7,290 analyses were made on the day. The deaths of eight patients were also confirmed, six from Montevideo, one from Canelones and one from Rivera, raising the total number of deaths to 415.

29 January 2021: 651 new cases are confirmed. The number of infected people rises to 40,529, which is nine fewer than the previous cumulative number due to nine infected people having tested positive in Uruguay and later left the national territory. The number of recoveries rises to 33,146, 95 patients are in ICU and no patient is on intermediate care. 8,468 analyses were made on the day. The deaths of ten patients were also confirmed, seven from Montevideo and three from Canelones, raising the total number of deaths to 425.

30 January 2021: 652 new cases are confirmed. The number of infected people rises to 41,181. The number of recoveries rises to 33,914, 95 patients are in ICU and no patient is on intermediate care. 6,077 analyses were made on the day. The deaths of six patients were also confirmed, three from Montevideo and three from Canelones, raising the total number of deaths to 431.

31 January 2021: 557 new cases are confirmed. The number of infected people rises to 41,738. The number of recoveries rises to 34,683, 90 patients are in ICU and no patient is on intermediate care. 5,302 analyses were made on the day. The deaths of five patients were also confirmed, four from Montevideo and one from Canelones, raising the total number of deaths to 436.

February 
1 February 2021: 396 new cases are confirmed. The number of infected people rises to 42,128, which is six fewer than the previous cumulative number due to nine infected people testes positive in Uruguay and later left the national territory. The number of recoveries rises to 35,535, 89 patients are in ICU and no patient is on intermediate care. 4,097 analyses were made on the day. The deaths of eight patients were also confirmed, six from Montevideo, one from Canelones and one from Rivera, raising the total number of deaths to 444.

2 February 2021: 539 new cases are confirmed. The number of infected people rises to 42,667. The number of recoveries rises to 36,178, 95 patients are in ICU and no patient is on intermediate care. 7,104 analyses were made on the day. The deaths of nine patients were also confirmed, three from Montevideo, two from Maldonado, one from Durazno and one from Rivera, raising the total number of deaths to 453.

3 February 2021: 548 new cases are confirmed. The number of infected people rises to 43,215. The number of recoveries rises to 36,820, 90 patients are in ICU and no patient is on intermediate care. 7,829 analyses were made on the day. The deaths of eleven patients wer also confirmed, six from Montevideo, two from Canelones, one from Maldonado, one from Tacuarembó and one from Rivera, raising the total number of deaths to 464.

4 February 2021: 594 new cases are confirmed. Te number of infected people rises to 43,804, which is five fewer than the previous cumulative number due to five infected people having tested positive in Uruguay and later left the national territory. The number of recoveries rises to 37,411, 92 patients are in ICU and no patient is on intermediate care. 6,814 analyses were made on the day. The deaths of twelve patients are also confirmed, seven from Montevideo, two from Rivera, one from Artigas, one from Canelones and one from Colonia, raising the total number of deaths to 476.

5 February 2021: 504 new cases are confirmed. The number of infected people rises to 44,303, which is five fewer than the previous cumulative number due to five infected people having tested positive in Uruguay and later left the national territory. The number of recoveries rises to 37,967, 91 patients are in ICU and no patient is on intermediate care. 5,792 analyses were made on the day. The deaths to two patients were also confirmed, one from Montevideo and one from Canelones, raising the total number of deaths to 478.

6 February 2021: 513 new cases are confirmed. The number of infected people rises to 44,812, which is five fewer than the previous cumulative number due to four infected people having tested positive in Uruguay and later left the national territory. The number of recoveries rises to 38,469, 87 patients are in ICU and no patient is on intermediate care. 4,662 analyses were made on the day. The deaths of three patients were also confirmed, two from Montevideo and one from Maldonado, raising the total number of deaths to 481.

7 February 2021: 499 new cases are confirmed. The number of infected people rises to 45,311. The number of recoveries rises to 38,976, 81 patients are in ICU and no patient is on intermediate care. 4,835 analyses were made on the day. The deaths of nine people were also confirmed, eight from Montevideo and one from Maldonado, raising the total number of deaths to 490.

8 February 2021: 342 new cases are confirmed. The number of infected people rises to 45,650, which is three fewer than the previous cumulative number due to three infected people having tested positive in Uruguay and later left the national territory. The number of recoveries rises to 39,677, 75 patients are in ICU and no patient is on intermediate care. 5,632 analyses were made on the day. The deaths of seven patients were also confirmed, four from Montevideo and three from Canelones, raising the total number of deaths to 497.

9 February 2021: 506 new cases are confirmed. The number of infected people rises to 46,153, which is three fewer than the previous cumulative number due to three infected people having tested positive in Uruguay and later left the national territory. The number of recoveries rises to 40,272, 76 patients are in ICU and no patient is on intermediate care. 6,563 analyses were made on the day. The deaths of nine patients were also confirmed, seven from Montevideo, one from Salto and one from Soriano, raising the total number of deaths to 506.

10 February 2021: 627 new cases are confirmed. The number of infected people rises to 46,778, which is two fewer than the previous cumulative number due to two infected people having tested positive in Uruguay and later left the national territory. The number of recoveries rises to 40,769, 76 patients are in ICU and no patient is on intermediate care. 6,933 analyses were made on the day. The deaths of ten patients were also confirmed, seven from Montevideo, two from Paysandú and one from San José, raising the total number of deaths to 516.

11 February 2021: 479 new cases are confirmed. The number of infected people rises to 47,254, which is three fewer than the previous cumulative number due to three infected people having tested positive in Uruguay and later left the national territory. The number of recoveries rises to 41,426, 81 patients are in ICU and no patient is on intermediate care. 6,126 analyses were made on the day. The deaths of eight patients were also confirmed, five from Montevideo, one from Canelones, one from Soriano and one from Tacuarembó, raising the total number of deaths to 524.

12 February 2021: 579 new cases are confirmed. The number of infected people rises to 47,828, which is five fewer than the previous cumulative number due to five infected people having tested positive in Uruguay and later left the national territory. The number of recoveries rises to 41,966, 79 patients are in ICU and no patient is on intermediate care. 5,817 analyses were made on the day. The deaths of three patients from Montevideo were also confirmed, raising the total number of deaths to 527.

13 February 2021: 581 new cases are confirmed. The number of infected people rises to 48,459. The number of recoveries rises to 42,505, 83 patients are in ICU  and no patient is on intermediate care. 5,759 analyses were made on the day. The deaths of six patients were also confirmed, three from Montevideo, two from Canelones and one from Rocha, raising the total number of deaths to 533.

14 February 2021: 456 new cases are confirmed. The number of infected people rises to 48,909, which is six fewer than the previous cumulative number due to six infected people having tested positive in Uruguay and later left the national territory. The number of recoveries rises to 42,899, 84 patients are in ICU and no patient is on intermediate care. 5,614 analyses were made on the day. The deaths of two patients were also confirmed, one from Canelones and one from Rivera, raising the total number of deaths to 535.

15 February 2021: 454 new cases are confirmed. The number of infected people rises to 49,360, which is three fewer than the previous cumulative number due to three infected people having tested positive in Uruguay and later left the national territory. The number of recoveries rises to 43,468, 81 patients are in ICU and no patient is on intermediate care. 3,402 analyses were made on the day. The deaths of six patients were also confirmed, four from Montevideo, one from Canelones and one from Maldonado, raising the total number of deaths to 541.

16 February 2021: 376 new cases are confirmed. The number of infected people rises to 49,725, which is eleven fewer than the previous cumulative number due to eleven infected people having tested positive in Uruguay and later left the national territory. The number of recoveries rises to 44,060, 80 patients are in ICU and no patient is on intermediate care. 5,010 analyses were made on the day. The deaths of five patients were also confirmed, two from Montevideo, one from Colonia, one from Paysandú and one from Tacuarembó, raising the total number of deaths to 546.

17 February 2021: 497 new cases are confirmed. The number of infected people rises to 50,208, which is fourteen fewer than the previous cumulative number due to fourteen infected people having tested positive in Uruguay and later left the national territory. The number of recoveries rises to 44,481, 71 patients are in ICU and no patient is on intermediate care. 6,032 analyses were made on the day. The deaths of seven patients were also confirmed, three from Montevideo, one from Cerro Largo, one from Paysandú, one from Rivera and one from Soriano, raising the total number of deaths to 553.

18 February 2021: 547 new cases are confirmed. The number of infected people rises to 50,752, which is three fewer than the previous cumulative number due to three infected people having tested positive in Uruguay and later left the national territory. The number of recoveries rises to 44,976, 71 patients are in ICU and no patient is on intermediate care. 6,562 analyses were made on the day. The deaths of five patients were also confirmed, two from Canelones, one from Montevideo, one from Soriano and one from Tacuarembó, raising the total number of deaths to 558.

19 February 2021: 636 new cases are confirmed. The number of infected people rises to 51,377, which is eleven fewer than the previous cumulative number due to eleven infected people having tested positive in Uruguay and later left the national territory. The number of recoveries rises to 45,398, 72 patients are in ICU and no patient is on intermediate care. 6,611 analyses were made on the day. The deaths of five patients were also confirmed, four from Montevideo and one from Canelones, raising the total number of deaths to 563.

20 February 2021: 790 new cases are confirmed. The number of infected people rises to 52,163, which is four fewer than the previous cumulative number due to four infected people having tested positive in Uruguay and later left the national territory. The number of recoveries rises to 45,881, 69 patients are in ICU and no patient is on intermediate care. 6,359 analyses were made on the day. The deaths of six patients were also confirmed, four from Montevideo, one from Artigas and one from Durazno, raising the total number of deaths to 569.

21 February 2021: 654 new cases are confirmed. The number of infected people rises to 52,815, which is two fewer than the previous cumulative number due to two infected people having tested positive in Uruguay and later left the national territory. The number of recoveries rises to 46,265, 65 patients are in ICU and no patient is on intermediate care. 5,304 analyses were made on the day. The deaths of five patients were also confirmed, three from Montevideo and two from Canelones, raising the total number of deaths to 574.

22 February 2021: 500 new cases are confirmed. The number of infected people rises to 53,310, which is five fewer than the previous cumulative number due to five infected people having tested positive in Uruguay and later left the national territory. The number of recoveries rises to 46,845, 68 patients are in ICU and no patient is on intermediate care. 4,867 analyses were made on the day. The deaths of nine patients were also confirmed, four from Montevideo, four from Canelones and one from Paysandú, raising the total number of deaths to 583.

23 February 2021: 666 new cases are confirmed. The number of infected people rises to 53,973, which is three fewer than the previous cumulative number due to three infected people having tested positive in Uruguay and later left the national territory. The number of recoveries rises to 47,512, 65 patients are in ICU and no patient is on intermediate care. 7,875 analyses were made on the day. The deaths of six patients are confirmed, four from Montevideo, one from San José and one from Rivera, raising the total number of deaths to 588.

24 February 2021: 904 new cases are confirmed. The number of infected people rises to 54,874, which is three fewer than the previous cumulative number due to three infected people having tested positive in Uruguay and later left the national territory. The number of recoveries rises to 48,035, 62 patients are in ICU and no patient is on intermediate care. 6,880 analyses were made on the day. the deaths of three patients were also confirmed, one from Canelones, one from San José and one from Río Negro, raising the total number of deaths to 591.

25 February 2021: 825 new cases are confirmed. The number of infected people rises to 55,695, which is four fewer than the previous cumulative number due to four infected people having tested positive in Uruguay and later left the national territory. The number of recoveries rises to 48,496, 61 patients are in ICU and no patient is on intermediate care. 7,034 analyses were made on the day. The deaths of four patients were also confirmed, two from Maldonado and two from Montevideo, raising the total number of deaths to 595.

26 February 2021: 854 new cases are confirmed. The number of infected people rises to 56,542, which is seven fewer than the previous cumulative number due to seven infected people having tested positive in Uruguay and later left the national territory. The number of recoveries rises to 49,012, 67 patients are in ICU and no patient is on intermediate care. 8,262 analyses were made on the day. The deaths of six patients were also confirmed, two from Montevideo, one from Artigas, one from Canelones, one from Florida and one from Maldonado, raising the total number of deaths to 601.

27 February 2021: 821 new cases are confirmed. The number of infected people rises to 57,362, which is one fewer than the previous cumulative number due to an infected person tested positive in Uruguay and later left the national territory. The number of recoveries rises to 49,466, 71 patients are in ICU and no patient is on intermediate care. 6,493 analyses were made on the day. The deaths of two patients from Montevideo were also confirmed, raising the total number of deaths to 603.

28 February 2021: 633 new cases are confirmed. The number of infected people rises to 57,994, which is one fewer than the previous cumulative number due to an infected person tested positive in Uruguay and later left the national territory. The number of recoveries rises to 50,039, 76 patients are in ICU and no patient is on intermediate care. 5,540 analyses were made on the day. The deaths of five patients were also confirmed, three from Montevideo, one from Canelones and one from Florida, raising the total number of deaths to 608.

March 
1 March 2021: 598 new cases are confirmed. The number of infected people rises to 58,589, which is three fewer than the previous cumulative number due to three infected people having tested positive in Uruguay and later left the national territory. The number of recoveries rises to 50,624, 76 patients are in ICU and no patient is on intermediate care. 5,478 analyses were made on the day. The deaths of three patients were also confirmed, one from Canelones, one from Montevideo and one from Rivera, raising the total number of deaths to 611.

2 March 2021: 606 new cases are confirmed. The number of infected people rises to 59,171, which is twenty-four fewer than the previous cumulative number due to this number of cases was eliminated. The number of recoveries rises to 51,365, 75 patients are in ICU and no patient is on intermediate care. 6,548 analyses were made on the day. The deaths of seven patients were also confirmed, four from Montevideo, one from Canelones, one from Durazno and one from Río Negro, raising the total number of deaths to 617.

3 March 2021: 907 new cases are confirmed. The number of infected people rises to 60,074, which is four fewer than the previous cumulative number due to this number of cases was eliminated. The number of recoveries rises to 51,978, 80 patients are in ICU and no patient is on intermediate care. 7,118 analyses were made on the day. The deaths of six patients were also confirmed, five from Montevideo and one from Rivera, raising the total number of deaths to 624.

4 March 2021: 874 new cases are confirmed. The number of infected people rises to 60,945, which is three fewer than the previous cumulative number due to this number of cases was eliminated. The number of recoveries rises to 52,612, 79 patients are in ICU and no patient is on intermediate care. 6,701 analyses were made on the day. The deaths of seven patients were also confirmed, four from Montevideo, one from Flores, one from Salto and one from San José, raising the total number of deaths to 631.

5 March 2021: 992 new cases are confirmed. The number of infected people rises to 61,929, which is eight fewer than the previous cumulative number due to this number of cases was eliminated. The number of recoveries rises to 53,419, 80 patients are in ICU and no patient is on intermediate care. 7,198 analyses were made on the day. The deaths of six patients were also confirmed, two from Canelones, one from Cerro Largo, one from Colonia, one from Montevideo and one from Tacuarembó, raising the total number of deaths to 637.

6 March 2021: 1,097 new cases are confirmed. The number of infected people rises to 63,010, which is eight fewer than the previous cumulative number due to this number of cases was eliminated. The number of recoveries rises to 54,175, 83 patients are in ICU and no patient is on intermediate care. 9,318 analyses were made on the day. The deaths of eight patients were also confirmed, four from Montevideo, two from Canelones, one from San José and one from Río Negro, raising the total number of deaths to 645.

7 March 2021: 833 new cases are confirmed. The number of infected people rises to 63,837, which is six fewer than the previous cumulative number due to this number of cases was eliminated. The number of recoveries rises to 54,861, 87 patients are in ICU and no patient is on intermediate care. 5,403 analyses were made on the day. The deaths of six patients were also confirmed, three from Montevideo, two from Rivera and one from Durazno, raising the total number of deaths to 651.

8 March 2021: 872 new cases are confirmed. The number of infected people rises to 64,700, which is nine fewer than the previous cumulative number due to this number of cases was eliminated. The number of recoveries rises to 55,638, 87 patients are in ICU and no patient is on intermediate care. 6,539 analyses were made on the day. The deaths of seven patients were also confirmed, four from Montevideo, one from Durazno, one from Paysandú and one from Salto, raising the total number of deaths to 658.

9 March 2021: 831 new cases are confirmed. The number of infected people rises to 65,527, which is four fewer than the previous cumulative number due to this number of cases was eliminated. The number of recoveries rises to 56,399, 88 patients are in ICU and no patient is on intermediate care. 6,951 analyses were made on the day. The deaths of eight patients were also confirmed, five from Montevideo, two from Canelones and one from Durazno, raising the total number of deaths to 666.

10 March 2021: 957 new cases are confirmed. The number of infected people rises to 66,484. The number of recoveries rises to 57,134, 91 patients are in ICU and no patient is on intermediate care. 6,999 analyses were made on the day. The deaths of twelve patients were also confirmed, four from Montevideo, two from Canelones, two from Salto, one from Artigas, one from Rivera, one from San José and one from Tacuarembó, raising the total number of deaths to 678.

11 March 2021: 1,238 new cases are confirmed. The number of infected people rises to 67,717, which is five fewer than the previous cumulative number due to this number of cases were eliminated. The number of recoveries rises to 57,773, 102 patients are in ICU and no patient is on intermediate care. 12,438 analyses were made on the day. The deaths of five patients were also confirmed, two from Colonia, one from Cerro Largo, one from Maldonado and one from Montevideo, raising the total number of deaths to 683.

12 March 2021: 1,366 new cases are confirmed. The number of infected people rises to 69,074, which is nine fewer than the previous cumulative number due to this number of cases was eliminated. The number of recoveries rises to 58,627, 110 patients are in ICU and no patient is on intermediate care. 12,457 analyses were made on the day. The deaths of six patients were also confirmed, four from Montevideo, one from Colonia and one from Tacuarembó, raising the total number of deaths to 689.

13 March 2021: 1,062 new cases are confirmed. The number of infected people rises to 70,133, which is three fewer than the previous cumulative number due to this number of cases was eliminated. The number of recoveries rises to 59,539, 117 patients are in ICU and no patient is on intermediate care. 16,324 analyses were made on the day. The deaths of nine patients from Montevideo were also confirmed, raising the total number of deaths to 698.

14 March 2021: 1,587 new cases are confirmed. The number of infected people rises to 71,691, which is twenty-nine fewer than the previous cumulative number due to this number of cases was eliminated. The number of recoveries rises to 60,517, 124 patients are in ICU and no patient is on intermediate care. 10, 129 analyses were made on the day. The deaths of fourteen patients were also confirmed, nine from Montevideo, two from Cerro Largo, one from Paysandú, one from Rocha and one from San José, raising the total number of deaths to 712.

15 March 2021: 1,182 new cases are confirmed. The number of infected people rises to 72,862, which is eleven fewer than the previous cumulative number due to this number of cases was eliminated. The number of recoveries rises to 61,609, 131 patients are in ICU and no patient is on intermediate care. 10,257 analyses were made on the day. The deaths of five patients were also confirmed, three from Montevideo, one from Colonia and one from San José, raising the total number of deaths to 717.

16 March 2021: 916 new cases are confirmed. The number of infected people rises to 73,770, which is eight fewer than the previous cumulative number due to this number of cases was eliminated. The number of recoveries rises to 62,584, 135 patients are in ICU and no patient is on intermediate care. 9,835 analyses were made on the day. The deaths of eight patients were also confirmed, four from Montevideo, one from Canelones, one from Lavalleja, one from Rocha and one from San José, raising the total number of deaths to 725.

17 March 2021: 1,389 new cases are confirmed. The number of infected people rises to 75,138, which is twenty-one fewer than the previous cumulative number due to this number of cases was eliminated. The number of recoveries rises to 63,475, 143 patients are in ICU and no patient is on intermediate care. 13,078 analyses were made on the day. The deaths of fifteen patients were also confirmed, eight from Montevideo, two from Cerro Largo, two from Río Negro, two from Salto and one from Canelones, raising the total number of deaths to 740.

18 March 2021: 1,698 new cases are confirmed. The number of infected people rises to 76,816, which is twenty fewer than the previous cumulative number due to this number of cases was eliminated. The number of recoveries rises to 64,492, 151 patients are in ICU and no patient is on intermediate care. 11,462 analyses were made on the day. The deaths of nine patients were also confirmed, seven from Montevideo, one from Artigas and one from Rivera, raising the total number of deaths to 749.

19 March 2021: 1,616 new cases are confirmed. The number of infected people rises to 78,401, which is thirty-one fewer than the previous cumulative number due to this number of cases was eliminated. The number of recoveries rises to 65,515, 164 patients are in ICU and no patient is on intermediate care. 15,002 analyses were made on the day. The deaths of eleven patients were also confirmed, seven from Montevideo, one from Cerro Largo, one from Durazno, one from Maldonado and one from Tacuarembó, raising the total number of deaths to 760.

20 March 2021: 1,528 new cases are confirmed. The number of infected people rises to 79,923, which is eight fewer than the previous cumulative number due to this number of cases was eliminated. The number of recoveries rises to 66,668, 174 patients are in ICU and no patient is on intermediate care. 12,007 analyses were made on the day. The deaths of sixteen patients were also confirmed, ten from Montevideo, two from Río Negro, one from Cerro Largo, one from Rivera, one from Rocha and one from Tacuarembó, raising the total number of deaths to 776.

21 March 2021: 1,625 new cases are confirmed. The number of infected people rises to 81,537, which is eleven fewer than the previous cumulative number due to this number of cases was eliminated. The number of recoveries rises to 67,730, 175 patients are in ICU and no patient is on intermediate care. 16,308 analyses were made on the day. The deaths of sixteen patients were also confirmed, eleven from Montevideo, one from Canelones, one from Cerro Largo, one from Flores, one from Rivera and one from Rocha, raising the total number of deaths to 792.

22 March 2021: 2,682 new cases are confirmed. The number of infected people rises to 84,212, which is seven fewer than the previous cumulative number due to this number of cases was eliminated. The number of recoveries rises to 68,983, 188 patients are in ICU and no patient is on intermediate care. 14,952 analyses were made on the day. The deaths of nineteen patients were also confirmed, six from Montevideo, two from San José, three from Salto, one from Artigas, one from Cerro Largo, one from Maldonado, one from Río Negro, one from Rivera and one from Treinta y Tres, raising the total number of deaths to 811.

23 March 2021: 1,801 new cases are confirmed. The number of infected people rises to 86,007, which is six fewer than the previous cumulative number due to this number of cases was eliminated. The number of recoveries rises to 70,372, 202 patients are in ICU and no patient is on intermediate care. 11,097 analyses were made on the day. The deaths of sixteen patients were also confirmed, ten from Montevideo, two from Canelones, two from San José, one from Río Negro and one from Rivera, raising the total number of deaths to 827.

24 March 2021: 1,796 new cases are confirmed. The number of infected people rises to 87,812, which is nine more than the previous cumulative number due to this number of cases were added. The number of recoveries rises to 71,588, 225 patients are in ICU and no patient is on intermediate care. 10,038 analyses were made on the day. The deaths of sixteen patients were also confirmed, five from Montevideo, four from Rivera, three from Tacuarembó, one from Canelones, one from Cerro Largo, one from Durazno and one from Soriano, raising the total number of deaths to 843.

25 March 2021: 1,693 new cases are confirmed. The number of infected people rises to 89,458, which is forty-seven fewer than the previous cumulative number due to this number of cases was eliminated. The number of recoveries rises to 72,919, 236 patients are in ICU and no patient is on intermediate care. 11,657 analyses were made on the day. The deaths of thirteen patients were also confirmed, seven from Montevideo, two from Soriano, one from Canelones, one from Rivera and one from Tacuarembó, raising the total number of deaths to 856.

Notes

References 

2021 in Uruguay
Disease outbreaks in Uruguay
 2021